Dario Černeka (born 7 December 1991) is a Croatian handball player. He currently plays for RK Varaždin 1930.

He competed at the Youth World Championship in 2009.

He is the son of retired handballer Williams Černeka.

Honours
Zamet
Croatian Cup Runner-up (1):  2012
Croatian Handball Championship U-18 Runner-up (1): 2008

Croatia U-21
Youth World Championship (1): 2009

Individual
Dražen Petrović Award - 2009
Dukat Premier League shooting wing best shot percentage in 2013-14 season - 73,1%

References

External links
Eurohandball profile

1991 births
Living people
Croatian male handball players
Handball players from Rijeka
RK Zamet players